Stephen Jardine (born 1963) is a Scottish journalist, broadcaster and presenter. He has worked for the BBC, Scottish Television, GMTV and Radio Tay.

Early years
Born in Dumfries, Jardine is the son of the late Bill Jardine, a former chairman of Queen of the South.

Career

Jardine started his journalistic career as a reporter at Radio Tay before joining Scottish Television (now STV Central) to work on Scotland Today.

He left STV in 1994 to become GMTV's Scotland Correspondent. He then moved to Paris as Europe Correspondent, and also presented on the GMTV sofa covering stories ranging from the death of the Princess of Wales to the Cannes Film Festival.

Jardine left GMTV in December 1999 and returned to STV as host of the station's Millennium Hogmanay Show live from the centre of Edinburgh, then he moved on to presenting the afternoon talk show Room at the Top and his own evening chat show Tonight at the Top. He has also presented a number of current affairs programmes for the station, such as Seven Days, Wheel Nuts, Sunday Live election programming and the channel's coverage of The State Opening of the Scottish Parliament. 

Jardine fronted feature programmes for STV including Drivetime, Summer Discovery, Wheel Nuts, Rich, Gifted & Scots and The Talent along with four live Hogmanay shows. Through February 2007, he presented a Saturday morning show on Talk 107, the now-defunct Edinburgh-based radio station between 10am and 1pm.

Jardine regularly presented STV's main flagship news programme "Scotland Today"  as well as the programme's online video blog, (Not) The Real MacKay. For his presenting work with STV, Jardine received a Royal Television Society Regional Presenter of the Year award.

From Monday, 28 January 2008, Jardine, along with Debi Edward (now Scotland Correspondent for ITV News), and, later, Rachel McTavish, presented STV's daily magazine programme, The Five Thirty Show, broadcasting across the station's Northern and Central regions. The programme ended on Friday, 22 May 2009, to be replaced by The Hour, airing weekdays at 5pm from Tuesday 26 May, with Jardine and Michelle McManus hosting.
 
In May 2011, Jardine announced he had decided to leave STV after ten years with the station. 
He went on to launch Scotland's first dedicated food and drink media company.

Taste Communications announced that Peter Lederer, former head of VisitScotland, would be the company chairman.

Alongside his business interests, Jardine is now a regular presenter on BBC Radio Scotland and fronted Election Reporting Scotland on BBC Scotland during the 2017 Election. He writes a weekly column in The Scotsman newspaper and contributes to the Daily Record. In February 2019, he was named as the presenter of the new flagship Debate Night current affairs series on BBC Scotland where politicians and public figures answer questions from members of the public.

References

External links

Stephen Jardine at Star Management

1963 births
Living people
People from Dumfries
Scottish television presenters
STV News newsreaders and journalists
GMTV presenters and reporters
People educated at Dumfries Academy